Travis Sanheim (born March 29, 1996) is a Canadian professional ice hockey defenceman for the  Philadelphia Flyers of the National Hockey League (NHL). Sanheim was selected by the Flyers in the first round, 17th overall, of the 2014 NHL Entry Draft.

Early life
Both Travis and his fraternal twin brother Taylor Sanheim were born on March 29, 1996, to Kent and Shelley Sanheim. The Sanheim family ran a farm in Elkhorn, Manitoba, where Travis and Taylor were born, raised, and worked through their childhoods and adolescence. Both brothers began playing minor ice hockey with the Yellowhead Chiefs in the Manitoba U-18 'AAA' Hockey League: while Taylor was on the wing, Travis would play defense. Although he eventually grew to be , Sanheim was often smaller than many of his minor hockey opponents, and in response, he learned how to skate and think faster to counterbalance his smaller size.

Playing career

Junior
The Calgary Hitmen of the Western Hockey League (WHL) selected Sanheim in the ninth round, 177th overall, of the 2011 WHL Bantam Draft. He debuted with the team for the 2013–14 season and had a difficult adjustment period, coupled by a late growth spurt, that limited Sanheim to only three points through his first 21 games of the season. He found his footing when paired defensively with Ben Thomas and received more playing time beginning in December after an injury to captain Jaynen Rissling. By the end of his rookie season, Sanheim had 29 points and a +25 plus–minus through 67 junior ice hockey games. That summer, the Philadelphia Flyers of the National Hockey League (NHL) selected Sanheim in the first round, 17th overall, of the 2014 NHL Entry Draft.

Sanheim attended both the Flyers' rookie and general training camps in 2014, and appeared in one preseason game, before returning to Calgary for the 2014–15 WHL season. He also signed an entry-level contract with Philadelphia just before the WHL and NHL seasons began. His sophomore season in the WHL proved to be a breakout, with 15 goals and 65 points in 67 games. Although he led all defensemen with 39 points through the first 41 games of the season, Sanheim found additional success starting in January when he was paired with Jake Bean, another offensively-minded defenseman. Through the remainder of their respective junior hockey careers, Sanheim and Bean served as primary scorers, as well as penalty killers, for a team that often lacked elite forwards. In the postseason, Sanheim scored the game-winning, double-overtime goal for the Hitmen to advance them past the Medicine Hat Tigers and into the Eastern Conference Finals for the Ed Chynoweth Cup. The Brandon Wheat Kings ultimately defeated the Hitmen in five games of the conference finals.

With a number of the Hitmen's playoff core leaving the team for the NHL just before the 2015–16 season, Sanheim, who was returned to the team after another training camp with Philadelphia, became a veteran presence for Calgary. He led all WHL defensemen in scoring with 22 points through the first 18 games of the season before suffering an upper-body injury in a game against the Prince Albert Raiders at the start of November. He missed nearly the entire month, returning on November 30 with a goal and an assist in a 4–3 overtime loss to the Regina Pats. Sanheim missed another stretch of games at the turn of the calendar year, during which time he was representing Canada at the 2016 World Junior Ice Hockey Championships. In his absence, Calgary appointed his twin brother Taylor as a temporary alternate captain. Despite missing a total of 15 regular season games, Sanheim finished his final season of junior hockey with 15 goals and 68 points, and he led all Canadian Hockey League (CHL) defensemen in points per game. Sanheim's junior hockey career ended when the Red Deer Rebels swept the Hitmen in the first round of 2016 WHL playoffs.

Professional
After the Hitmen's season ended, Sanheim joined the Flyers' American Hockey League (AHL) affiliate, the Lehigh Valley Phantoms, for the final stretch of their 2015–16 season. He appeared in four games for the Phantoms, recording three points in the process. Sanheim returned to the Phantoms for the 2016–17 AHL season, where he and his defensive pair Samuel Morin worked with assistant coach Kerry Huffman in order to heighten the physical aspect of their game for an older, larger group of skaters. While Sanheim's offensive abilities were already strong from his junior career, his work with Huffman helped Sanheim to develop his overall game. He did not score a goal until December, but through 63 games, Sanheim had both scored 10 goals and 29 points and he carried a +7 plus-minus. He finished the year with 10 goals and 37 points in 76 AHL games. All but one of these goals were at full strength, as T. J. Brennan was the Phantoms' main power play defenseman.

Sanheim made Philadelphia's final roster out of training camp and started the 2017–18 season in the NHL. He scored his first NHL goal on December 14, 2017, in his 28th NHL game, to help the Flyers defeat the Buffalo Sabres 2–1. He was reassigned to Philadelphia's American Hockey League (AHL) affiliate, the Lehigh Valley Phantoms, on January 22, 2018, but was later recalled on March 9 due to an injury to Robert Hägg. Sanheim made his Stanley Cup playoff debut during the first round of the 2018 playoffs against the Pittsburgh Penguins. He recorded his first career playoff goal on April 15 in a 5–1 loss to the Penguins. The Flyers ended up losing to the Penguins in six games, after which Sanheim was loaned to the Phantoms to help them with their run in the 2018 Calder Cup playoffs.

On June 24, 2019, Sanheim signed a new two-year, $6.5 million contract.

Sanheim and his defensive mate Philippe Myers were two of the young Flyers to struggle in the protracted  season, during which Philadelphia went 25-23-8. The loss of veteran presence in Matt Niskanen particularly affected many of the team's young defenders, as Alain Vigneault struggled to find a stable top pairing for Ivan Provorov. Sanheim was also the first Flyer to test positive for the COVID-19 virus during a team outbreak that February. Although he did not experience any significant symptoms, he was forced to isolate from February 7 to 18. The 2020-21 season proved to be the worst of Sanheim's career thus far, as he dropped to only three goals, 15 points, and a –22 rating while skating in all but one of the 56 games in the shortened season. Although statistically Sanheim's defensive performance was similar to seasons prior, his mistakes tended to be costlier during the 2020-21 season, with his turnovers and positioning leading more often to goals against than they had earlier in his NHL career.

Sanheim, a restricted free agent going into the  season, successfully avoided contract arbitration on August 21, when he signed a two-year contract extension that carried an average annual value of $4.675 million. As Myers had been traded to the Nashville Predators over the summer, Sanheim's new partner on the second defensive line was Rasmus Ristolainen, who the Flyers had received in a trade with the Buffalo Sabres.

International play

Sanheim was chosen to compete with the Canada Western squad at the 2013 World U-17 Hockey Challenge, and he led Canada to capture the bronze medal at the 2014 IIHF World U18 Championships (WJC-18). At the WJC-18, Sanheim led all defencemen with six points, and was named one of Canada's top three players in the tournament, also earning recognition as the tournament's best defenceman.

Career statistics

Regular season and playoffs

International

Awards and honours

References

External links
 

1996 births
Living people
Calgary Hitmen players
Canadian ice hockey defencemen
Canadian twins
Ice hockey people from Manitoba
Lehigh Valley Phantoms players
National Hockey League first-round draft picks
Philadelphia Flyers draft picks
Philadelphia Flyers players
Twin sportspeople